The Immaculate Heart of Mary Cathedral or just Nzérékoré Cathedral, is a religious building of the Catholic Church which is located in the town of Nzérékoré the second largest city in the African country of Guinea.

The cathedral follows the Roman Catholic or Latin rite and serves as the seat of the diocese of Nzérékoré (Dioecesis Nzerekorensis) which was created in 1937 by Pope Pius XI by the Bull "Quo ex Evangelii".

It is under the pastoral responsibility of the Bishop Raphael Balla Guilavogui.

See also
Immaculate Heart of Mary Cathedral
Roman Catholicism in Guinea

References

Roman Catholic cathedrals in Guinea
Nzérékoré